Tell Me Something I Don't Know may refer to:

 "Tell Me Something I Don't Know" (Selena Gomez song), 2008
 "Tell Me Something I Don't Know" (Charlie Major song), 1995
 "Tell Me Something I Don't Know", a song by Mindy McCready from the 1996 album Ten Thousand Angels
 Tell Me Something I Don't Know (game show), a radio game show produced by Stephen Dubner and the New York Times